David Lyon may refer to:

Dave Lyon (footballer, born 1948) (1948–2019), English football forward
Dave Lyon (footballer, born 1951) (1951–1999), English football defender
Dave Lyon (track coach) (1938–2013), Canadian track and field coach
David Lyon (actor) (1941–2013), British actor
David Lyon (cricketer) (born 1943), English cricketer
David Lyon (designer) (born 1968), car designer
David Lyon (rugby) (born 1965), English rugby league and rugby union player
David Lyon (sociologist) (born 1948), professor of sociology at Queen's University, Kingston, Ontario
David Lyon (British politician) (1794–1872), West India merchant, Member of Parliament and landowner
David Gordon Lyon (1852–1922), American theologian
David Murray Lyon (1888–1956), British physician and medical author
David Bowes-Lyon (1902–1961), brother of Elizabeth Bowes-Lyon, the Queen Mother 
David Murray-Lyon (1890–1975), officer in the Indian Army
David Lyon (Nigerian politician) (born 1970), disqualified governor-elect of Bayelsa State

See also
David Lyons (disambiguation)